Barkly Homestead is a roadhouse in the Northern Territory of Australia  located on the Barkly Tableland. It is located near the intersection of the Barkly Highway and the Tablelands Highway between the Queensland Border town of Camooweal and the Northern Territory town of Tennant Creek. The roadhouse provides, fuel, meals, snacks, camping, motel, cabin, and powered caravan sites to travellers. It is the only stop between the Stuart Highway and the border of Queensland.

References

External links
Official Barkly Homestead web site

Roadhouses in the Northern Territory